The city of Spokane, located in the east of the U.S. state of Washington, is the metropolitan center of the Inland Northwest region of the United States, where it serves as a hub for retail trade and services. , Spokane has 40 high-rise buildings. High-rise development began in 1891, shortly after the Great Spokane Fire of 1889, with the completion of the  Review Building featuring a traditional brick-and-stone construction. In the late 19th century, the term skyscraper was typically used to describe buildings of a relatively modest 10 to 20 stories in height that were built on a ground level of thick masonry walls, as opposed to the contemporary usage of the term which is often used to describe more modern high-rise buildings in excess of 40 or 50 stories that were made possible with the incorporation of a metal framework. After the advent of steel-frame construction, allowing for increased strength to support more floors, local applications of this technology began showing up in a significant way in the early 20th century in the form of the U.S. Bank Building (built 1910) and the Paulsen Medical and Dental Building (built 1929), both of which became the tallest in the city. The U.S. Bank Building was also the tallest building in the state of Washington upon its completion. The current tallest building in Spokane, surpassing the Paulsen Medical and Dental Building, is the  Bank of America Financial Center, which was completed in 1981 and has held the distinction for  years.

Cityscape

Tallest buildings

This height includes spires and architectural details but does not include antenna masts. Spokane's first high-rise, the Review Building was the tallest building in Spokane upon completion in 1891 and held the title for roughly 10 years. The U.S. Bank Building was the tallest building in the city from 1910 until 1929 when it was surpassed in height by the Paulsen Medical and Dental Building, which lasted as the tallest from 1929 until 1981 when the current tallest building, the Bank of America Financial Center was completed.

In popular culture
The subject of skyscrapers in Spokane entered popular culture in an episode of How I Met Your Mother when a proposed building became a topic of discussion, where main character, Ted Mosby, an architect, was tasked by his boss with designing a 78-story skyscraper for a client in downtown Spokane. When revealed to the client later in the episode, the building was ridiculed for its phallic shape and the design was rejected.

See also

 Architecture of Spokane, Washington

Notes

References
General
 
 
Specific

External links
 Spokane and skyscraper diagram at SkyscraperPage
 Spokane at the Council on Tall Buildings and Urban Habitat

Spokane
Buildings and structures in Spokane, Washington
Tallest in Spokane